Allan David Pearce (born 7 April 1983) is a former New Zealand footballer.

He currently works as a physiotherapist in Auckland.

Club career
Born in Wellington, Pearce joined Barnsley on a three-year scholarship in December 1999 and progressed through the academy ranks at the club and into the reserves. In August 2002, Pearce joined Worksop Town on work experience for an indefinite period, impressing in a pre-season friendly victory over Sheffield Wednesday before making his Northern Premier League debut for the Tigers in the 2–0 home defeat to Burscough on 17 August 2002.

In October 2002 he signed professionally for Lincoln City where he made a number of League 2 appearances before returning to his native New Zealand to play for Waitakere United.

In September 2006, Pearce re-signed with Waitakere United after a short spell playing in England again, this time with Worksop Town when they were in the Conference North Division.

International career
Pearce has represented New Zealand at under 17 and under 23 level.

He made his full All Whites debut in a 3-1 World Cup qualifier win over New Caledonia on 6 September 2008.

References

External links

Lincoln City F.C. Official Archive Profile

1983 births
Living people
New Zealand association footballers
New Zealand international footballers
New Zealand physiotherapists
Association footballers from Wellington City
Association football forwards
Barnsley F.C. players
Worksop Town F.C. players
Lincoln City F.C. players
Waitakere United players
English Football League players
Northern Premier League players
2008 OFC Nations Cup players
New Zealand Football Championship players